Autumn Games is an American video game publisher based in New York City. The company was founded by Alex Collmer and Jason Donnell in 2007 with institutional sponsorship from Communications Equity Associates and Autumn Entertainment Partners.

The company's first video game was Def Jam Rapstar. which was nominated for awards in the annual Spike Video Game Awards  The game was co-published by Autumn Games and Konami Digital Entertainment. Def Jam Rapstar was the result of a several-year publishing arrangement between Autumn Games and 4mm Games.

In November 2011, the company released their second game, developed by Isopod Labs. The game was a collaboration with Jimmie Johnson named Jimmie Johnson's Anything with an Engine.

Autumn Games also had a publishing partnership with Famous Games.

Autumn Games also partnered with Reverge Labs to publish the 2D fighting game Skullgirls. Skullgirls released on Xbox Live Arcade and PlayStation Network on April 2012. The game was later released in Japan on the PlayStation Network in February 2013.

References

External links
Official website

American companies established in 2007
Video game companies established in 2007
Mass media companies based in New York City
Video game publishers
Video game companies of the United States